Rhynchoglossum is a genus of plant in family Gesneriaceae. In recent times, members of the former genus Klugia are also included. Species within the broader genus are found in India, southern China to New Guinea and about three species in tropical America. The genus has a leaf arrangement that is termed as alternate-distichous and the leaves are asymmetric in shape. The flowers have two lips. The older genus Klugia had four stamens compared to the typical two but Klugia from southern India are found to be very close based on molecular evidence.

Species
Species include:
 Rhynchoglossum ampliatum (C.B.Clarke) B.L.Burtt
 Rhynchoglossum azureum (Schltdl.) B.L.Burtt
 Rhynchoglossum borneense Merr.
 Rhynchoglossum capsulare Ohwi ex Karton.
 Rhynchoglossum gardneri W.L.Theob. & Grupe
 Rhynchoglossum klugioides C.B.Clarke
 Rhynchoglossum lazulinum A.S.Rao & J.Joseph
 Rhynchoglossum mirabilis Patthar.
 Rhynchoglossum notonianum (Wall.) B.L.Burtt
 Rhynchoglossum obliquum Blume
 Rhynchoglossum omeiense W.T.Wang
 Rhynchoglossum saccatum Patthar.
 Rhynchoglossum spumosum Elmer

References

External links
 Flora of China: Rhynchoglossum

Didymocarpoideae
Gesneriaceae genera
Indomalayan realm flora
Neotropical realm flora